The 1904 New South Wales state election involved 90 electoral districts returning one member each. The election was conducted on the basis of a simple majority or first-past-the-post voting system. There were two significant changes from the 1901 election, the first was that women were given the right to vote, which saw an increase in the number of enrolled voters from 345,500 in 1901, to 689,490 in 1904. The second was that as a result of the 1903 New South Wales referendum, the number of members of the Legislative Assembly was reduced from 125 to 90. The combined effect of the changes meant that the average number of enrolled voters per electorate went from 2,764, to 7,661, an increase of 277%. Leichhardt was the only district that was not substantially changed, while The Macquarie and The Murray districts retained nothing but the name.

In this election, in 20 electorates the winning candidate received less than 50% of the votes, while 2 were uncontested. Two seats were contested by 3 sitting members.

Of the 125 members of the house prior to the election, 4 were appointed to the Legislative Council, 10 did not contest the election, and a further 41 were defeated at the election. 70 members (56%) retained a seat after the election.

Election results

Albury

Albury lost part of the district to Corowa and was expanded to include part of the abolished seat of The Hume. Thomas Griffith (Independent), the member for Albury, did not contest the  election, while Gordon McLaurin (Progressive) was the member for The Hume.

Alexandria

Alexandria was a new seat, comprising parts of the seat of Botany and the abolished seats of Darlington, Newtown-Erskine and Waterloo. John Dacey was the member for Botany who had lost Labour pre-selection for that seat, while George Anderson was the member for the abolished seat of Waterloo. The member for Darlington was Phillip Sullivan (Labour) who successfully contested Phillip while the member for Newtown-Erskine was Robert Hollis (Labour) who successfully contested Newtown.

Allowrie

Allowrie was a new seat comprising the abolished seat of Kiama as well as parts of The Shoalhaven and Illawarra. Mark Morton was the member for The Shoalhaven while Alexander Campbell was the member for Kiama. The member for Illawarra was Edward Allen (Liberal Reform) who unsuccessfully contested Wollongong.

Annandale

Annandale lost parts of the district to The Glebe and Roxelle. It absorbed parts of Petersham and the abolished seat of Newtown-Camperdown. The member for Annandale was William Mahony (Liberal Reform). The member for Petersham was John Cohen (Liberal Reform) who successfully contested that seat while the member for Newtown-Camperdown was James Smith (Independent Progressive) who successfully contested Camperdown.

Armidale

Armidale was expanded to include part of the abolished seat of Uralla-Walcha. Sydney Kearney was the member for Armidale while Michael MacMahon was the member for Uralla-Walcha.

Ashburnham

Ashburnham was one of two seats contested by 3 sitting members. The district lost parts to Belubula and absorbed parts of the abolished seats of Condoublin and Molong. Joseph Reymond had held the seat since the 1898 election as a member of the Progressive Party, however was standing as an independent. The member for Condoublin was Patrick Clara (Labour) and Eden George (Liberal Reform) was the member for the abolished seat of Sydney-Belmore. The member for Molong was Andrew Ross (Independent Liberal) who unsuccessfully contested Orange.

Ashfield

Ashfield lost part of the district to Burwood and was expanded to include part of Petersham. Frederick Winchcombe (Liberal Reform) was the member for Ashfield. The member for Petersham was John Cohen (Liberal Reform) who successfully contested that electorate.

Balmain

Balmain consisted of Balmain North and part of Balmain South. John Storey was the member for the abolished seat of Balmain North, while the member for Balmain South was Sydney Law (Independent Labour) who successfully contested Rozelle.

Bathurst

Bathurst was expanded to include part of The Macquarie. It was held by William Young (Progressive). The member for The Macquarie was William Hurley (Progressive) who was appointed to the Legislative Council.

Bega

Bega was expanded to include part of the abolished district of Eden-Bombala. Henry Clarke (Progressive) was the member for Bega while William Wood (Liberal Reform) was the member for Eden-Bombala.

Belmore

Belmore was a new seat consisted of the abolished seat of Sydney-Belmore and parts of the abolished seats of Sydney-Cook and Sydney-Phillip. The member for Sydney-Belmore was Eden George (Liberal Reform) who successfully contested Ashburnum. The members for Sydney-Cook, Samuel Whiddon (Liberal reform), and Sydney-Phillip, Daniel O'Connor (Progressive), did not contest the election. Edward O'Sullivan (Progressive) was the member for Queanbeyan.

Belubula

Belubula was a new seat consisting of the abolished seat of Cowra and parts of Ashburnum, Orange and the abolished seat of Molong. Thomas Waddell (Progressive) was the member for the abolished seat of Cowra. The member for Orange was Harry Newman (Liberal Reform) who died two months prior to the election. The member for Molong was Andrew Ross (Independent Liberal) who unsuccessfully contested Orange. Thomas Rose (Liberal Reform) was member for the abolished seat of Argyle.

Bingara 

Bingara was expanded to include part of Uralla-Walcha. Samuel Moore (Liberal Reform) was the member for Bingara. The member for the abolished seat of Uralla-Walcha was Michael MacMahon (Progressive) who unsuccessfully contested Armidale.

Blayney

Blayney was a new seat consisting of parts of Hartley, The Macquarie and the abolished seat of West Macquarie. Paddy Crick was the member for West Macquarie. The member for Hartley was John Hurley (Independent) who successfully contested that seat while his brother William (Progressive) was the member for The Macquarie who was appointed to the Legislative Council.

Botany

Botany lost part of the district to Randwick and absorbed part of Newtown-St Peters. The member for Botany was John Dacey who, lost Labour pre-selection and successfully contested Alexandria instead. The member for Newtown-St Peters was James Fallick (Independent Liberal) who successfully contested Singleton as an official Liberal Reform candidate.

Broken Hill 

Broken Hill absorbed part of the abolished seat of Alma. John Cann (Labour) was the member for Broken Hill. William Williams (Independent Labour), the member for Alma, unsuccessfully contested Sturt as an independent.

Burrangong

Burrangong was a new seat consisting of parts of the abolished seats of Boorowa, Grenfell and Young, each of which were held by the Labour Party. The member for Young was George Burgess. The member for Boorowa was Niels Nielsen who successfully contested Yass and the member for Grenfell was William Holman who successfully contested Cootamundra.

Burwood

Burwood was expanded to include part of Ashfield. The member for Burwood was William Archer (Independent). The member for Ashfield was Frederick Winchcombe (Liberal Reform) who successfully contested that electorate.

Camden

Camden lost part of the district to Wollondilly and absorbed parts of Canterbury and the abolished seats of The Nepean, and Woronora. The member for Camden was John Kidd (Progressive).  The member for The Nepean was Thomas Smith who unsuccessfully contested Sherbrooke. The member for Woronora was John Nicholson who successfully contested Wollongong.

Camperdown

Camperdown was a new seat consisting of parts of Annandale and the abolished seats of Newtown-Camperdown, Darlington, Newtown-Camperdown and Newtown-Erskine. James Smith (Progressive) was the member for Newtown-Camperdown. There was a battle for the Liberal pre-selection between William Clegg and John Salmon, with Salmon withdrawing from the process and standing as an independent, splitting the liberal vote.

Canterbury

Canterbury lost part of the district to Camden and Granville. It absorbed parts of Marrickville, Petersham and St George. Thomas Mackenzie (Liberal Reform) was the member for Canterbury. Each of the members for Marrickville. Petersham and St George successfully contested their district.

The Castlereagh

The Castlereagh was a new seat consisting of the abolished seat of Coonamble and part of the abolished seat of Dubbo. The member for Coonamble was Hugh Macdonald (Labour). The member for Dubbo was Simeon Phillips (Liberal Reform) who stayed with the majority of the seat and unsuccessfully contested The Macquarie.

The Clarence

The Clarence lost much of the district to Raleigh and absorbed all of Grafton and a part of Raleigh. The Premier Sir John See (Progressive) was the member for Grafton while John McFarlane (Progressive) was the member for The Clarence. The question of the Progressive candidate was resolved when Sir John See decided to retire due to ill health and accepted an appointment to the Legislative Council.

The Clyde

The Clyde was a new seat which absorbed the whole of whole of the abolished seat of Moruya and parts of the abolished seats of Braidwood and The Shoalhaven. The member for Moruya was William Millard (Liberal Reform). The member for The Shoalhaven was Mark Morton (Liberal Reform) who successfully contested Allowrie. The member for Braidwood was Albert Chapman (Progressive) who did not contest the election.

Cobar

Cobar absorbed parts of The Lachlan and parts of the abolished seats of The Barwon, Condoublin and Wilcannia. The member for The Barwon was William Willis (Progressive) who unsuccessfully contested The Darling. The member for Condoublin was Patrick Clara (Labour) who unsuccessfully contested Ashburnum. The member for The Lachlan was James Carroll (Progressive) who unsuccessfully contested that seat. The member for Wilcannia was Richard Sleath (Independent Labour) who also unsuccessfully contested The Darling.

Cootamundra

Cootamundra was a new seat that consisted of part of The Murrumbidgee, and parts of the abolished seats of Gundagai, Wagga Wagga and Young. John Barnes was the member for Gundagai. The member for The Murrumbidgee was Thomas Fitzpatrick (Progressive) who unsuccessfully contested that seat. The member for Wagga Wagga James Gormly (Progressive) did not contest the election and was appointed to the Legislative Council. The member for Young was George Burgess (Labour) who successfully contested Burrangong. William Holman (Labour) was the member for the abolished seat of Grenfell.

Corowa

Corowa was a new seat comprising parts of Albury, Murray and the abolished seat of The Hume. Gordon McLaurin (Progressive) was the member for The Hume, however he successfully contested Albury, while James Hayes (Progressive), the member for The Murray was appointed to the Legislative Council and did not contest the election.

The Darling

The Darling was a new seat comprising Bourke and parts of The Barwon and Wilcannia electorates. The member for Bourke was William Davis (Progressive) who did not contest the election. The member for The Barwon was William Willis (Progressive) while the member for Wilcannia was Richard Sleath who had initially been elected as a Labour candidate at the 1894 election, but had lost his Labour endorsement prior to the 1901 election which he won as an Independent Labour candidate.

Darling Harbour

Darling Harbour was a new seat consisting of the abolished seats of Sydney-Gipps, Sydney-Lang, and parts of the abolished seats of Sydney-King and Sydney-Denison. The member for Sydney-Gipps was William Daley (Labour)  and he won the Labour pre-selection ahead of the member for Sydney-Lang, John Power, who did not contest the election. The member for Sydney-King was Ernest Broughton (Progressive) who successfully contested King as a Liberal Reform candidate. The member for Sydney-Denison was Andrew Kelly who successfully contested The Lachlan.

Darlinghurst

Darlinghurst was a new seat consisting of parts of Paddington and the abolished seats of Sydney-Fitzroy and Sydney-Bligh. The member for Sydney-Fitzroy was Daniel Levy (Liberal Reform). The member for Sydney-Bligh was Patrick Quinn (Progressive) who unsuccessfully contested King. The member for Paddington was Charles Oakes (Liberal Reform) who successfully contested that seat.

Deniliquin

Deniliquin was expanded to include part of The Murray. The sitting member for Deniliquin was Joseph Evans (Independent Progressive) who died three weeks prior to the election. The member for The Murray was James Hayes (Progressive) who was appointed to the Legislative Council and did not contest the election.

Durham

Durham was expanded to include part of Gloucester. The member for Durham was Walter Bennett (Progressive). The member for Gloucester was Richard Price (Independent) who nominated to contest Durham however he withdrew from the contest.

The Glebe

The Glebe was expanded to include part of Annandale. The member for The Glebe was James Hogue (Liberal Reform). The member for Annandale was William Mahony (Liberal Reform) who successfully contested that seat.

Gloucester

Gloucester lost part of the district to Durham and absorbed part of Manning. The member for Gloucester was Richard Price (Independent) who nominated to contest Durham however he withdrew from the contest. John Thomson (Progressive) was the member for Manning.

Gordon

Gordon was a new seat and consisted of part of the abolished seat of Willoughby. The member for Willoughby was Charles Wade (Liberal Reform).

Gough

Gough was a new seat that comprised the abolished seat of Glenn Innes and part of Inverell. The member for Glen Innes was Follet Thomas (Labour). The member for Inverell was George Jones (Labour) who successfully contested The Gwydir.

Goulburn

Goulburn was expanded to include part of the abolished seat of Argyle. The member for Goulburn was James Ashton (Liberal Reform). The member for Argyle was Thomas Rose (Liberal Reform) who unsuccessfully contested Belubula.

Granville

Granville was expanded to include part of Canterbury. The member for Granville was John Nobbs (Liberal Reform). The member for Canterbury was Thomas Mackenzie (Liberal Reform) who successfully contested that seat.

The Gwydir

The Gwydir was a new seat and comprised the abolished seat of Moree and part of Inverell. The member for Moree was Percy Stirton (Liberal Reform) and George Jones (Labour) was the member for Inverell.

Hartley

Hartley lost part of the district to Blayney and Wollondilly and was expanded with parts of The Macquarie, Northumberland, and the abolished seat of Rylstone. The member for Hartley was John Hurley (independent) who stood as a Liberal Reform candidate.  The member for The Macquarie was his brother William Hurley (Progressive), who was appointed to the Legislative Council. The member for Rylstone was John Fitzpatrick who unsuccessfully contested Northumberland. The member for Northumberland was John Norton (Independent) who successfully contested Surry Hills.

The Hastings and The Macleay

The Hastings and The Macleay was expanded to include part of the abolished seat of The Manning. The member for The Hastings and The Macleay was Robert Davidson (Liberal Reform). The member for The Manning was John Thomson (Progressive) who unsuccessfully contested Gloucester.

The Hawkesbury

The Hawkesbury lost part of the district to Sherbrooke and was expanded to include parts of Northumberland, and the abolished seat of The Nepean. The member for The Hawkesbury was Brinsley Hall (Progressive). The member for Northumberland was John Norton (Independent) who successfully contested Surry Hills. The member for The Nepean was Thomas Smith who unsuccessfully contested Sherbrooke.

Kahibah

Kahibah was expanded to include part of Waratah and the abolished seat of Newcastle West. The member for Kahibah was Alfred Edden (Labour). The member for Newcastle West was Owen Gilbert (Liberal Reform) who unsuccessfully contested Wickham while the member for Waratah was Matthew Charlton (Labour) who successfully contested Northumberland.

King

King was a new seat which largely replaced the abolished seat of Sydney-King less a part lost to Darling Harbour. It was expanded to include parts of Sydney-Bligh and Sydney-Fitzroy. The member for Sydney-King was Ernest Broughton (Progressive), however he stood as a Liberal Reform candidate. The member for Sydney-Bligh was Patrick Quinn (Progressive). The member for Sydney-Fitzroy was Daniel Levy (Liberal Reform) who successfully contested Darlinghurst.

The Lachlan

The Lachlan was one of two seats contested by 3 sitting members. The district lost parts to Cobar and The Murray and was expanded to absorb part of the abolished seats of Condoublin Grenfell. The member for the Lachlan was James Carroll (Progressive) who stood as Independent Liberal Reform candidate. The member for Condoublin was Patrick Clara (Labour) who unsuccessfully contested Ashburnum. The member for Grenfell was William Holman (Labour) who successfully contested Cootamundra. William Ferguson (Liberal Reform) was the Independent Labour member for Sturt while Andrew Kelly (Labour) was the member for the abolished seat of Sydney-Denison.

Lane Cove

Lane Cove was a new seat and consisted of parts St Leonards and the abolished seats of Ryde and Willoughby. the member for St Leonards was Edward Clark (Liberal Reform) who unsuccessfully contested that seat as an Independent Liberal Reform candidate. The member for Willoughby was Charles Wade (Libberal Reform) who successfully contested Gordon. The member for Ryde was Edward Terry (Independent) who did not contest the election.

Leichhardt

Leichhardt was not significantly changed. John Hawthorne had been the Liberal Reform member for Leichhardt for 10 years, however stood as an Independent Liberal Reform Candidate, having been denied pre-selection in favour of Robert Booth, who had the support of the United Protestant Defence Association due to Hawthorne voting to grant money to various charities which included a Catholic orphanage.

Liverpool Plains

Liverpool Plains was a re-established seat, comprising parts of the abolished seats of Gunnedah, Quirindi, and Wellington. The member for Gunnedah was David Hall (Labour). The member for Quirindi was Robert Levien (Progressive) who successfully contested Tamworth. The member for Wellington was John Haynes (Liberal Reform) who unsuccessfully contested Mudgee.

The Macquarie

The Macquarie electorate retained nothing but the name, the former district being divided between Bathurst, Blayney and Hartley. The member for The Macquarie was William Hurley (Progressive) who was appointed to the Legislative Council. The district re-created in 1904 consisted of parts of the abolished seats of Dubbo and Wellington. The member for Dubbo was Simeon Phillips (Liberal Reform). The member for Wellington was John Haynes (Liberal Reform) who unsuccessfully contested Mudgee.

Maitland

Maitland was a new seat comprising parts of the abolished seats of East Maitland and West Maitland. John Gillies was the Independent member for West Maitland, while James Brunker was the Liberal Reform member for East Maitland.

Marrickville

Marrickville lost part of the district to Canterbury and Petersham and was expanded to include part of the abolished seat of Newtown-St Peters. The member for Marrickville was Richard McCoy (Liberal Reform).  The member for Newtown-St Peters was James Fallick (Independent Liberal) who successfully contested Singleton as an official Liberal Reform candidate.

Middle Harbour

Middle Harbour was a new seat and consisted of part of the abolished seat of Warringah and the balance of Warringah was included in St Leonards. The member for Warringah was Ellison Quirk (Independent).

Monaro

Monaro was expanded to include parts of parts of Queanbeyan and the abolished seat of Eden-Bombala. The member for Monaro was Gus Miller (Labour). The member for Queanbeyan was Edward O'Sullivan (Progressive) who successfully contested Belmore. The member for Eden-Bombala was William Wood (Liberal Reform) who successfully contested Bega.

Mudgee

Mudgee was expanded to include part of the abolished seat of Wellington. The member for Mudgee was Edwin Richards (Progressive) and the member for Wellington was John Haynes (Liberal Reform).

The Murray

The Murray electorate retained nothing but the name, the former district being divided between Corowa and Deniliquin. The member for The Murray was James Hayes (Progressive) who was appointed to the Legislative Council and did not contest the election. The district re-created in 1904 consisted of the abolished seat of Wentworth and parts of The Lachlan and the abolished seat of Hay. The member for Wentworth was Robert Scobie (Labour). The member for The Lachlan was James Carroll (Progressive) who unsuccessfully contested that seat. The member for Hay was Frank Byrne who did not contest the election.

The Murrumbidgee

The Murrumbidgee lost part of the district to Cootamundra and was expanded to include parts of the abolished seats of Hay and Wagga Wagga. The member for The Murrumbidgee was Thomas Fitzpatrick (Progressive). The member for Wagga Wagga James Gormly (Progressive) was appointed to the Legislative Council and did not contest the election. The member for Hay was Frank Byrne who did not contest the election. The member for The Barwon was William Willis (Progressive) who unsuccessfully contested The Darling.

The Namoi

The Namoi was a re-created seat comprising the abolished seat of Narrabri as well as parts of the abolished seats of Gunnedah and The Barwon. The member for Narrabri was Albert Collins (Liberal Reform), who was not a member of Liberal Reform but was recommended by the party. The member for Gunnedah was David Hall (Labour) who unsuccessfully contested Liverpool Plains.

Newcastle

Newcastle was a re-created seat that consisted of the abolished seat of Newcastle East and part of the abolished seat of Newcastle West. The member for Newcastle East was William Dick (Liberal Reform). The member for Newcastle West was Owen Gilbert (Liberal Reform) who unsuccessfully contested Wickham.

Newtown

Newtown was a re-created seat and consisted of parts of the abolished seats of Newtown-Erskine, Newtown-Camperdown and Newtown-St Peters. The member for Newtown-Erskine was Robert Hollis (Labour). The member for Newtown-Camperdown was James Smith (Independent Progressive) who successfully contested Camperdown. The member for Newtown-St Peters was James Fallick (Independent Liberal) who successfully contested Singleton as an official Liberal Reform candidate.

Northumberland

Northumberland lost part of the district to Hartley and The Hawkesbury and was expanded to include parts of the abolished seats of East Maitland, West Maitland and Wallsend. The member for Northumberland was John Norton (Independent) who successfully contested Surry Hills. The member for West Maitland, John Gillies (Independent), defeated the member for East Maitland, James Brunker (Liberal Reform), for Maitland. The member for Wallsend was John Estell (Labour) who successfully contested Waratah while the member for Waratah was Matthew Charlton (Labour). John Fitzpatrick was the member for Rylstone.

Orange

Orange lost part of the district to Belubula and was expanded to include part of the abolished seat of Molong. The member for Orange was Harry Newman (Liberal Reform) who died two months prior to the election. The member for Molong was Andrew Ross (Independent Liberal)

Paddington

Paddington lost part of the district to Darlinghurst and Woolahra and was expanded to include parts of Randwick and the abolished seat of Sydney-Bligh. The member for Paddington was Charles Oakes (Liberal Reform). The member for Randwick was David Storey (Liberal Reform) who successfully contested that seat. The member for Sydney-Bligh was Patrick Quinn (Progressive) who unsuccessfully contested King.

Parramatta

Parramatta was expanded to include part of the abolished seat of Ryde. The member for Parramatta was Tom Moxham (Liberal Reform). The member for Ryde was Edward Terry (Independent Liberal) who did not contest the election.

Petersham

Petersham lost part of the district to Annandale, Ashfield and Canterbury and was expanded to include part of Marrickville. The member for Petersham was John Cohen (Liberal Reform). The member for Marrickville was Richard McCoy (Liberal Reform) who successfully contested that seat.

Phillip

Phillip was a new seat and consisted of parts of the abolished seats of Sydney-Phillip and Darlington. The member for Darlington was Phillip Sullivan (Labour). The member for Sydney-Phillip was Daniel O'Connor (Progressive) who did not contest the election.

Pyrmont

Pyrmont was a new seat and consisted of the abolished seat of Sydney-Pyrmont and part of the abolished seat of Sydney-Denison. The member for Sydney-Pyrmont was John McNeill (Labour). The member for Sydney-Denison was Andrew Kelly who successfully contested The Lachlan.

Queanbeyan

Queanbeyan lost part of the district to Monaro and was expanded to include parts of Yass and the abolished seat of Braidwood. The member for Queanbeyan was Edward O'Sullivan (Progressive) who successfully contested Belmore while the member for Yass was William Affleck (Liberal Reform) who unsuccessfully contested that seat. The member for Braidwood was Albert Chapman (Progressive) who did not contest the election.

Raleigh

Raleigh lost part of the district to The Clarence and was expanded to include much of The Clarence. The member for Raleigh was George Briner (Progressive). The member for The Clarence was John McFarlane (Progressive) who successfully contested that seat.

Randwick

Randwick lost parts of the district to Paddington, Surry Hills and Waverley and was expanded to include parts of Botany and Waverley. The member for Randwick was David Storey (Liberal Reform). The member for Botany was John Dacey (Labour) who successfully contested Alexandria. The member for Waverley was Thomas Jessep (Liberal Reform) who successfully contested that seat.

Redfern

Redfern was expanded to include part of the abolished seat of Darlington. The member for Redfern was James McGowen (Labour). The member for Darlington was Phillip Sullivan (Labour) who successfully contested Phillip.

The Richmond

The Richmond lost much of the district to Tenterfield and was expanded to include all of the abolished seat of Ballina and parts of the abolished seats of Lismore and The Tweed. The member for The Richmond was Robert Pyers (Progressive) who unsuccessfully contested Tenterfield. The member for Ballina was John Perry (b 1845). The member for Lismore was John Coleman (Liberal Reform) who successfully contested Rous, defeating the member for The Tweed, Richard Meagher (Independent), who stood as a Progressive candidate.

Rous

Rous was a new district and consisted of parts of the abolished seats of Lismore and The Tweed. John Coleman (Liberal Reform) was the member for Lismore. Richard Meagher was the independent member for The Tweed.

Rozelle

Rozelle was a new seat that consisted of parts of the abolished set of Balmain South and Annandale. The member for Balmain South was Sydney Law who initially won that seat as a Labour candidate, before resigning and winning the seat as an Independent Labour candidate at the 1902 Balmain South by-election and contesting this election as an endorsed Liberal Reform candidate. The member for Annandale was William Mahony (Liberal Reform) who successfully contested that seat.

St George

St George lost part of the district to Canterbury.

St Leonards

St Leonards lost part of the district to Lane Cove and was expanded to include part of Warringah. The member for St Leonards was Edward Clark (Liberal Reform), who had defeated Thomas Creswell as an independent liberal candidate at the 1901 election. For 1904 Creswell was selected as the official Liberal candidate while Clark ran as an independent liberal candidate.

Sherbrooke

Sherbrooke was expanded to include part of The Hawkesbury and parts of the abolished seats of The Nepean and Ryde and Willoughby. Broughton O'Conor (Liberal Reform) was the independent member for Sherbrooke while Thomas Smith (Progressive) was the member for The Nepean. The member for The Hawkesbury was Brinsley Hall (Progressive) who successfully contested that seat, the member for Willoughby was Charles Wade (Liberal Reform) who successfully contested the replacement seat of Gordon while the member for Ryde was Edward Terry (Independent) who did not contest the election.

Singleton

Singleton absorbed part of the seat of Northumberland and parts of the abolished seats of Robertson and Rylstone. The member for Northumberland was John Norton (Independent) who successfully contested Surry Hills, the member for Robertson was William Fleming (Liberal Reform) who successfully contested  The Upper Hunter and the member for Rylstone was John Fitzpatrick (Liberal Reform) who unsuccessfully contested Northumberland. Charles Dight (Progressive) was the member for Singleton while James Fallick (Independent Liberal) was the member for Newtown-St Peters.

Sturt

Sturt absorbed part of the abolished seat of Alma and Rylstone. The member for Sturt was William Ferguson (Independent Labour) who unsuccessfully contested The Lachlan while William Williams (Independent Labour) was the member for Alma. Arthur Griffith (Labour) had previously been the member for Waratah however he resigned to unsuccessfully contest the 1903 federal election.

Surry Hills

Surry Hills was a new seat consisting of the abolished seat of Sydney-Flinders, which was expanded with part of Randwick and part of the abolished seat of Sydney-Cook. Arthur Nelson (Progressive) was the member for Sydney-Flinders while John Norton (Independent) was the member for Northumberland.

Tamworth

Tamworth was expanded to include part of the abolished seat of Quirindi. Raymond Walsh (Independent) had won the 1901 election for Tamworth, however he was made bankrupt in 1903 and was defeated in the subsequent by-election, by John Garland (Liberal Reform). Robert Levien (Progressive) was the member for Quirindi and had previously been one of two members for Tamworth from 1880 until 1894.

Tenterfield

Tenterfield was expanded to include part of The Richmond. Charles Lee (Liberal Reform) was the member for Tenterfield while Robert Pyers (Progressive) was the member for The Richmond.

The Upper Hunter

The Upper Hunter was a re-created seat which comprised parts of the abolished seats of Robertson and Rylstone. William Fleming (Liberal Reform) was the member for Robertson and the member for Rylstone was John Fitzpatrick (Liberal Reform) who unsuccessfully contested Northumberland.

Waratah

Waratah lost parts of the seat to Wickham and Kahibah and was expanded to include part of the abolished seats of East Maitland and Wallsend. John Estell (Labour) was the member for Wallsend. The member for Waratah was Matthew Charlton (Labour) who successfully contested Northumberland while the member for East Maitland, James Brunker (Liberal Reform), unsuccessfully contested Maitland.

Waverley

Waverley lost part of the seat to Randwick and was expanded to include parts of Woollahra and Randwick. The member for Waverley was Thomas Jessep (Liberal Reform). The member for Randwick was David Storey (Liberal Reform) while the member for Woollahra was William Latimer and each retained their respective seats.

Wickham

Wickham was expanded to include part of Waratah and part of the abolished seat of Newcastle West. John Fegan (Progressive) was the member for Wickham while Owen Gilbert (Liberal Reform) was the member for Newcastle West.

Wollondilly

Wollondilly was a new seat comprising parts of the abolished seats of Bowral and Argyle and parts of Camden and Hartley. William McCourt (Liberal Reform) was the member for Bowral. The member for Hartley was John Hurley (Independent) who successfully retained that seat. The member for Argyle was Thomas Rose (Liberal Reform) who unsuccessfully contested Belubula. The member for Camden was John Kidd (Progressive) who unsuccessfully contested Camden.

Wollongong

Wollongong was a new seat comprising parts of the abolished seats of Woronora and Illawarra and was originally going to retain the name Woronora, John Nicholson (Labour) was the member for Woronora while Edward Allen (Liberal Reform) was the member for Illawarra.

Woollahra

Woollahra lost part of the seat to Waverley and was expanded to include part of Paddington. William Latimer (Liberal Reform) was the member for Woollahra. The member for Paddington was Charles Oakes (Liberal Reform) who successfully contested that seat.

Wynyard

Wynyard was a new seat, comprising all of the abolished seat of Tumut and part of the abolished seat of Gundagai. The member for Tumut was Robert Donaldson (Progressive) while the  member for Gundagai was John Barnes (Progressive) who unsuccessfully contested Cootamundra.

Yass

Yass lost part of the electorate to Queanbeyan and was expanded to include parts of the abolished seats of Boorowa and West Macquarie. The member for Yass was William Affleck (Liberal Reform) while the member for Boorowa was Niels Nielsen (Labour). The member for West Macquarie was Paddy Crick (Progressive) who successfully contested Blayney.

See also 
 Candidates of the 1904 New South Wales state election
 Members of the New South Wales Legislative Assembly, 1904–1907

Notes

References 

1904